Arabanoo (b.circa 1758 – d.1789) was an Indigenous Australian man of the Eora forcibly abducted by the European settlers of the First Fleet at Port Jackson on New Year's Eve, 1788, in order to facilitate communication and relations between the Aborigines and the Europeans. Arabanoo was the first Aboriginal person of Australia to live among Europeans.

Background

Life for the settlers at Port Jackson was difficult in the first years and did not help relations between the Aboriginal people of the Eora clans and the Europeans. Governor Arthur Phillip decided that the "state of petty warfare and endless uncertainty" had to end. He decided to kidnap an Aboriginal person, as he explained in a Letter to Lord Sydney:
"It was absolutely necessary that we should attain their language, or teach them ours that the means of redress might be pointed out to them, if they are injured, and to reconcile them by showing the many advantages they would enjoy by mixing with us." At Manly cove, two Aboriginal people were seized but one escaped. He appeared to be about 30 years old.

Captivity

In order to prevent him from escaping, Arabanoo was usually restrained by handcuff and rope, or iron chains, and was locked in a hut with a convict at night. When Arabanoo was first cuffed, he believed the handcuffs to be unique ornaments, but he became enraged when he discovered the purpose. Though the governor's goal of improving relations was somewhat noble, the kidnapping of Arabanoo did not do a great deal of good.
He did not learn English very quickly, "At least not to the point where he could make Phillip any wiser on the grievances of the natives." In any case, convicts would soon launch vigilante attacks on the Aboriginal people near Botany Bay.
In 1789, smallpox broke out in the settlement, and spread amongst the Indigenous population. Having no immunity, an estimated 2000 died. After only 6 months amongst the settlers, Arabanoo died of smallpox, which he called galgalla, on 18 May 1789. He was buried in the garden of the government building. Colonel David Collins said his death was "to the great regret of everyone who had witnessed how little of the savage was found in his manner, and how quickly he was substituting in its place a docile, affable, and truly amiable deportment".

See also
Australian Aboriginal culture
History of Australia
History of Australia (1788–1850)
History of Indigenous Australians

References

 Keneally, Tom. The Commonwealth of Thieves: The Sydney Experiment(2005). Random House. pp. 195–204, 208–212. 
 Geoffrey, Blainey. A Shorter History of Australia.(2009). Random House.

External links
 

History of Indigenous Australians
1789 deaths
Deaths from smallpox
Year of birth unknown
Eora people
1758 births